Mike Martucci is an American politician from the state of New York. A Republican, Martucci represented the 42nd district of the New York State Senate, based in the western Hudson Valley, from January 1, 2021 to December 31, 2022.

Early career
At age 22, Martucci founded Quality Bus Service, a school bus business which provided service to the Greenwood Lake Union Free School District. The company eventually grew to include over 550 employees and 350 buses, and currently operates in school districts across Orange County and Ulster County. Quality Bus Service was sold in April of 2018.

In each of the ten years Martucci owned Quality Bus, the company consistently earned over a 90% New York State Bus Net Safety Score, the safety score goal established by the Department of Transportation. 

In November of 2015, Martucci was voted President of the New York School Bus Contractors Association. As association president, he worked on several pieces of school bus safety legislation, including a law passed by Gov. Andrew Cuomo (D-NY) in May of 2019, which allows school districts to cooperate with police in ticketing and enforcing Stop-Arm (bus-passing) driving violations. Accompanying this initiative, Martucci hosted two statewide "Operation Safe Stop" Events during his presidency, which brought awareness to the issue of passing stopped school buses outside of the legislative chambers.

State Senate
In 2020, Martucci announced he would run for the 42nd district of the New York State Senate against freshman Democrat Jen Metzger. After winning the Republican primary unopposed, Martucci narrowly defeated Metzger 50.5-49.5% in the general election. He took office in January 2021.

In 2022, Martucci led an effort to put forward an amendment that would end school mask mandates. The bill failed, with unanimous Republican support and unanimous Democratic dissent, a vote of 20-43.

In May 2022, Martucci announced he would not seek re-election to a second term.

Personal life
Martucci lives in New Hampton with his wife, Erin, and their three children.

Electoral History

References

Living people
People from Orange County, New York
New York (state) Republicans
21st-century American politicians
Marist College alumni
1985 births